Megachile xanthura is a species of bee in the family Megachilidae. It was described by Spinola in 1853.

References

Xanthura
Insects described in 1853